Hit Parade is a 1953 West German musical comedy film directed by Erik Ode and starring Germaine Damar, Walter Giller and Nadja Tiller.

It was shot at the Spandau Studios in Berlin. The film's sets were designed by the art directors Kurt Herlth and Karl Weber.

Cast

References

Bibliography

External links 
 

1953 films
1953 musical comedy films
German musical comedy films
West German films
1930s German-language films
Films directed by Erik Ode
German black-and-white films
Films shot at Spandau Studios
1950s German films
1930s German films